The 2011 Donegal county football team season was the franchise's 107th season since the County Board's foundation in 1905. The team ended the season as Ulster champions after winning the 2011 Ulster Senior Football Championship. It was their sixth title and a first since Brian McEniff led the team to Sam MCMXCII.

Ahead of the new season, Jim McGuinness was appointed as the team's manager, bringing to an end the era of John Joe Doherty. The arrival of McGuinness brought the first appearance of a soon-to-be revolutionary tactic The System.

Panel
New manager Jim McGuinness included Kevin Cassidy (who intended to retire at the end of the previous season) and Michael Hegarty (who was not involved in the previous season) in his squad for the 2011 Dr McKenna Cup. Also named were several of the under-21s, including Peter Boyle, Thomas McKinley, Daniel McLaughlin, Kevin Mulhern and Antoin McFadden, and Johnny Bonner and Marty Boyle, stars of Naomh Conaill's run to the 2010 Ulster club football final. Johnny Bonner did not play in any of the league games.

McKenna Cup panel
Paul Durcan, Peter Boyle, Karl Lacey, Neil McGee, Barry Dunnion, Johnny Bonner, Tomas McKinley, Edward Kelly, Neil Gallagher, Rory Kavanagh, Christopher Murrin, Dermot Molloy, Michael Hegarty, Colm McFadden, Daniel McLaughlin, Marty Boyle, David Walsh, Adrian Hanlon, Michael Murphy, Paddy McGrath, Kevin Mulhern, Leo McLoone, Ryan Bradley, Kevin Cassidy, Frank McGlynn, Antoin McFadden.

Details

Christy Toye (St Michael's)

Championship panel

Competitions

League

Opener: win vs Sligo

Ulster Senior Football Championship

All-Ireland Senior Football Championship

Kit

Management team
Manager: Jim McGuinness
Selectors: Rory Gallagher, Maxi Curran
Goalkeeping coach: Pat Shovelin
Strength and conditioning coach: Adam Speer
Surgical consultant: Kevin Moran
Team doctor: Charlie McManus
Team physio: Dermot Simpson 
Physiotherapists: Charlie Molloy, Paul Coyle, Donal Reid, JD.

Awards

All Stars
Donegal achieved three All Stars.

County breakdown
 Dublin = 6
 Kerry = 4
 Donegal = 3
 Mayo = 1
 Kildare = 1

References

Donegal county football team seasons